Laurence Ryan was an Irish priest, theologian and Bishop of Kildare and Leighlin.

Biography
Laurence Ryan was born in 1931, to Michael and Brigid Ryan of Ballycrinnigan, St Mullin's, County Carlow.

He was educated locally and at St. Mary's Knockbeg College; he went to Maynooth College to study for the priesthood. He was ordained in 1956 and following postgraduate studies awarded a doctorate in 1958; subsequently he was appointed to the staff of the St. Patrick's College, Carlow. He studied in Germany for a year gaining a Doctorate in Theology.

He served as President of Carlow College from 1974 to 1980, and was appointed in 1975 Vicar General for the Diocese of Kildare and Leighlin.

Leaving Carlow College, Ryan served as parish priest of Naas, Co. Kildare, from 1980 to 1985. He was award the title of Monsignor.

Ryan was appointed coadjutor bishop in 1984 and became Bishop of Kildare and Leighlin on 10 December 1987, succeeding Bishop Lennon. Bishop Ryan resigned 4 June 2002 and retired.

During his time at Carlow Cathedral, he presided over some changes to the altar which were controversial.

Ryan died on 13 October 2003, in Beaumont Hospital in Dublin.

References

1931 births
2003 deaths
Alumni of St Patrick's College, Maynooth
Bishops of Kildare
20th-century Roman Catholic bishops in Ireland
People educated at St Mary's Knockbeg College
Academics of St. Patrick's, Carlow College
People from County Carlow
21st-century Roman Catholic bishops in Ireland